If Tomorrow Never Comes (film) is a 2016 Ghanaian drama that features the tumultuous life of Awurabena. Awurabena's mother committed suicide and following the suicide, Awurabena's uncle ends up selling Awurabena and the brother into slavery.  

The film was written and directed by Pascal Amanfo and produced by YN Productions.

Cast 
Yvonne Nelson is Awurabena

Stars include the following:

Kweku Elliot
Michelle McKinny Hammond
Deyemi Okanlawon
Belinda Asiamah
Rebecca Acheampong
Khareema Aguiar
Bismark Nii Odoi
David Dontoh
Ophelia Dzidzormu
Christy Ukata

Screenings 
The movie premiered at the 2016 Africa International Film Festival (AFRIFF).

References 

Ghanaian drama films
2016 films